The 1993 Connecticut Huskies softball team represented the University of Connecticut in the 1993 NCAA Division I softball season. The Huskies were led by Karen Mullins in her 10th year as head coach, and played as part of the Big East Conference. Connecticut posted a 45–14 record (17–1 in conference) and earned an invitation to the 1993 NCAA Division I softball tournament. The Huskies lost their first game against eventual runner-up , defeated  and were eliminated by eventual third-place finisher .

Roster

Schedule

Notes

References 

Connecticut
UConn Huskies softball seasons
UConn softball
Women's College World Series seasons
Big East Conference softball champion seasons